Mina Bern (May 5, 1911 – January 10, 2010) was a Polish and American actress. She was a star of the Yiddish theater.

Biography
Mina Bernholtz was born in Bielsk Podlaski in Poland. Her theatrical debut was in Bialystok under the director Yehuda Greenhoyz. In 1930, through her relative Moishe Broderzon, she shortened her name and auditioned successfully to join the Ararat Yiddish cabaret theater in Łódź, and then played at the Warsaw Scala and later, the Kaminska theaters and the local folk theater. With Dina Halperin and Sam Bronetski she worked in the collective Our Theater, and later with Zygmunt Turkov. A few years later, she established a small cabaret theater in Białystok.

Bern fled to Russia with her daughter after the Nazi invasion of Poland; there she played with the "Bialistocker yidishn miniatur-teatr" (miniature revi-teater) of Shimon Dzigan and Israel Shumacher. In 1944 she was sent to a camp in Uganda where she did children's theater for Poles stationed there. Through Jewish family connections she went to Kenya in 1945 and from there to Israel where she worked with Jenny Lavitz in the revue Rozhinkes mit mandlen, favorably reviewed and subsequently staged at the Hebrew Li-La-Lo revue theater. In 1949, after an incident in which she was accused of sending a thug to beat up theater critic Haim Gamzu, who had written a bad review of her performance, she emigrated to the United States. She married actor and producer Ben Bonus. Living in New York City, she and her husband operated the Village Theater, which ran Yiddish performances. She recorded songs in Hebrew.

Death
She died in 2010, and was buried at Mount Hebron Cemetery in Flushing, Queens.

Awards
Bern received an Obie Award in 1999, for her performance in Sweet Dreams (Zise khaloymes), at the Folksbiene.

Filmography
Brooklyn Babylon (2001) .... Nanna
Flawless (1999) .... Mrs. Spivak
Celebrity (1998) .... Elderly Homeowner
The First Seven Years (1998) (TV) .... Landlady
I'm Not Rappaport (1996)
 Everything Relative (1996) .... Grandma Kessler
 Little Odessa (1994) .... Grandma Tsilya
 It Could Happen to You (1994) .... Muriel's Neighbour
 Pressure Drop (1994) .... Ida Potashner
 Avalon (1990) .... Alice Krichinsky
 Crossing Delancey (1988) .... Would-be Victim
 Tenement (1985) (as Mina Bern Bonas) .... Ruth

See also
Music of Israel
Shoshana Damari

References

External links
 
 Remembering Mina Bern, Star of the Yiddish Stage at Forward

1911 births
2010 deaths
American people of Polish-Jewish descent
American stage actresses
Jewish American actresses
Jewish cabaret performers
Polish emigrants to the United States
Obie Award recipients
Yiddish theatre performers
People from Białystok
Polish cabaret performers
Burials at Mount Hebron Cemetery (New York City)
21st-century American Jews
21st-century American women